Eric Geiselman (born March 9, 1988) is an American professional surfer who, in November 2009, had his surfboard snapped in half by what was thought to be a great white shark, whilst surfing off Lagunda Road, Santa Cruz, California. He also has a younger brother Evan, who has won 12 East Coast Championship titles.

He appeared on the television show New Pollution.

References

1988 births
Living people
American surfers